Dum Dum Lok Sabha constituency is one of the 543 parliamentary constituencies in India. The constituency centres on Dum Dum in West Bengal. All the seven assembly segments of No. 16 Dum Dum Lok Sabha constituency are in North 24 Parganas district.

Assembly segments

As per order of the Delimitation Commission in respect of the delimitation of constituencies in the West Bengal, parliamentary constituency no. 16 Dum Dum is composed of the following segments from 2009:

Members of Parliament

Election results

General election 2019

General election 2014

General election 2009

|-
! style="background-color:#E9E9E9;text-align:left;" width=225 |Party
! style="background-color:#E9E9E9;text-align:right;" |Seats won
! style="background-color:#E9E9E9;text-align:right;" |Seat change
! style="background-color:#E9E9E9;text-align:right;" |Vote percentage
|-
| style="text-align:left;" |Trinamool Congress
| style="text-align:center;" | 19
| style="text-align:center;" | 18
| style="text-align:center;" | 31.8
|-
| style="text-align:left;" |Indian National Congress
| style="text-align:center;" | 6
| style="text-align:center;" | 0
| style="text-align:center;" | 13.45
|-
| style="text-align:left;" |Socialist Unity Centre of India (Communist) 
| style="text-align:center;" | 1
| style="text-align:center;" | 1
| style="text-align:center;" | NA
|-
|-
| style="text-align:left;" |Communist Party of India (Marxist)
| style="text-align:center;" | 9
| style="text-align:center;" | 17
| style="text-align:center;" | 33.1
|-
| style="text-align:left;" |Communist Party of India
| style="text-align:center;" | 2
| style="text-align:center;" | 1
| style="text-align:center;" | 3.6
|-
| style="text-align:left;" |Revolutionary Socialist Party
| style="text-align:center;" | 2
| style="text-align:center;" | 1
| style="text-align:center;" | 3.56
|-
| style="text-align:left;" |Forward bloc
| style="text-align:center;" | 2
| style="text-align:center;" | 1
| style="text-align:center;" | 3.04
|-
| style="text-align:left;" |Bharatiya Janata Party
| style="text-align:center;" | 1
| style="text-align:center;" | 1
| style="text-align:center;" | 6.14
|-
|}

General election 2004

General election 1999

General election 1998

General election 1996

General election 1991

General election 1989

General election 1984

General election 1980

General election 1977

General elections 1977-2004
Most of the contests were multi-cornered. However, only winners and runners-up are mentioned below:

See also
 Dum Dum
 List of Constituencies of the Lok Sabha

References

External links
Dum Dum lok sabha  constituency election 2019 result details

Lok Sabha constituencies in West Bengal
Politics of North 24 Parganas district